"I'm Gonna Be Somebody" is a song written by Jill Colucci and Stewart Harris, and recorded by American country music artist Travis Tritt.  It released in May 1990 as the third single from his debut album Country Club. It reached No. 2 in the United States, behind Shenandoah's "Next to You, Next to Me", while it became his second No. 1 hit in Canada.

Content
The song is a moderate up-tempo describing a young male named Bobby, who lives in a lower-class community with rather difficult economical issues. Bobby is an aspiring young singer and musician whose lifelong dream is to have a successful career in the music business; however, people in his community beg to differ and advise Bobby to instead choose a more realistic source of income, as they believe a career in music is not a good option. Bobby quietly ignores their advice and continues his quest to pursue his dreams and prove all of the nonbelievers wrong. A decade passes before Bobby finally achieves those dreams; he is now one of the most successful recording artists (presumably in country music) with a top concert tour and number-one radio singles to his credit. Bobby eventually performs a summer homecoming concert; and during his performance, he happens to hear a singing voice coming from the front row of the audience, which is said to be another young male who has exactly the same dreams and ambitions that Bobby once had long ago.

Personnel
The following musicians play on this track:
Mike Brignardello – bass guitar
Larry Byrom – acoustic guitar
Wendell Cox – electric guitar solo
Paul Franklin – pedal steel guitar, lap steel guitar
Jack Holder – electric guitar
Dana McVicker – background vocals
Mark O'Connor – fiddle
Bobby Ogdin – piano, keyboards
Jim "Jimmy Joe" Ruggierre – harmonica
Steve Turner – drums, percussion
Reggie Young – electric guitar

Chart positions

Year-end charts

References

1990 singles
Travis Tritt songs
Songs written by Jill Colucci
Warner Records Nashville singles
Songs written by Stewart Harris
1990 songs